Spring Valley Historic District, also known as Mechanic's Valley, is a national historic district located in Buckingham Township, Bucks County, Pennsylvania.  The district includes 32 contributing buildings, 1 contributing site, and 2 contributing structures in the crossroads village of Spring Valley. They include a variety of residential, commercial, and institutional buildings, some of which are representative of the vernacular Georgian and Federal styles. The residential buildings are predominantly 2 1/2-story, stuccoed stone structures, some of which date to mid-18th century.  Notable buildings include the Upper Mill or Spring Valley Mill (c. 1740), Lower Mill (c. 1820), blacksmith and wheelwright shop, cooperage, store, and two inns—the "Neff's Tavern" and Temperance Inn (c. 1838).  The structures are the Spring Valley Mill Dam and a stone arch bridge.

It was added to the National Register of Historic Places in 1988.

References

Historic districts in Bucks County, Pennsylvania
Federal architecture in Pennsylvania
Georgian architecture in Pennsylvania
Historic districts on the National Register of Historic Places in Pennsylvania
National Register of Historic Places in Bucks County, Pennsylvania